United Nations Security Council resolution 717, adopted unanimously on 16 October 1991, after noting a report by the Secretary-General Javier Pérez de Cuéllar and reaffirming Resolution 668 (1990), the Council decided to establish the United Nations Advance Mission in Cambodia (UNAMIC) immediately after the signing of agreements for a political settlement in Cambodia.

UNAMIC would consist of the deployment of 1,504 personnel in order to help the Cambodian parties maintain a ceasefire until the deployment of the United Nations Transitional Authority in Cambodia. The resolution called for the co-operation of the Supreme National Council of Cambodia and all parties with the Mission regarding the implementation of the agreements in the political settlement, welcoming the decision of the co-chairman of the Paris Conference to reconvene it at an early date in order to sign the agreements.

Finally, Resolution 717 required the Secretary-General to submit a report on developments in the situation by 15 November 1991.

See also
 List of United Nations Security Council Resolutions 701 to 800 (1991–1993)
 Modern Cambodia
 United Nations Security Council Resolution 718
 Transition of the People's Republic of Kampuchea to Cambodia

References

External links
 
Text of the Resolution at undocs.org

 0717
20th century in Cambodia
Political history of Cambodia
 0717
October 1991 events
1991 in Cambodia